Another You is a 1991 American comedy film.

Another You may also refer to:

"Another You" (David Kersh song), 1997 song by David Kersh
"Another You", song by John Rich from his 2009 album Son of a Preacher Man
"Another You" (Armin van Buuren song), 2015 song by Armin van Buuren featuring Mr. Probz